Spencer Watt (born December 15, 1988) is a professional Canadian football wide receiver who is currently a free agent. He was most recently a member of the Hamilton Tiger-Cats  of the Canadian Football League (CFL). He was drafted 18th overall by the Toronto Argonauts in the 2010 CFL Draft. He played college football for Simon Fraser University.

Personal life
After first joining football in grade 12, Spencer enrolled at Minot State where he also competed in track & field. After one year, Spencer transferred to Simon Fraser where he majored in Arts. His parents are Elizabeth and Mike, and he has an older sister named Melissa. Spencer played high school football at Windsor Secondary in North Vancouver.

College career
Started career at Minot State (2006) before transferring to Simon Fraser (2007–09)…2009 - Played in seven games and caught 14 passes for 231 yards and 2 touchdowns…Named offensive player of the week in Canada West…2008 - Finished season with 301 yards and 16 receptions, both SFU career highs…Scored one touchdown on the season…Played in eight of the Clan’s ten games…Registered a season-high four receptions for 90 yards in playoff win over Saskatchewan Huskies. 2007 - First season with SFU, finished year with 194 yards receiving on 13 receptions…Registered a season-high six receptions for 112 yards against UBC…Played in seven of eight games on the year….2006 - Attended Minot State University as a freshman and competed in track & field.

Professional career

Toronto Argonauts
He was drafted in the 3rd Round, 18th overall by the Toronto Argonauts in the 2010 CFL Draft and signed with Toronto on May 19, 2010. During his time with Toronto he has gone to the playoffs and won the 2012 Grey Cup. Watt was signed to a two-year contract extension with Toronto on January 17, 2013.

Hamilton Tiger-Cats
Upon entering free agency, Watt signed with the Hamilton Tiger-Cats on February 10, 2015. Watt missed the entire 2015 CFL season, after he was sidelined with a torn achilles. On May 16, 2017, it was announced that Watt along with five other players were released by the Tiger-Cats.

Career statistics

Receiving stats

References

External links
Hamilton Tiger-Cats bio 
Toronto Argonauts bio 
 

1988 births
Living people
Canadian football wide receivers
Simon Fraser Clan football players
Toronto Argonauts players
Hamilton Tiger-Cats players
People from North Vancouver
Sportspeople from British Columbia
Players of Canadian football from British Columbia